Henrik Tagesen Reventlow (fl. 15th century; died 12 June 1441), from Funen, was supporter of King Eric and leader of peasant army of 25000 during peasant revolt in Denmark, at the time of reign of King Christopher III of Denmark.

History 

The great peasant uprising had raged for several years in Northern Jutland. In 1436 peasants from Skåne  refused to pay an extra defense tax for military efforts against the Swedes and in 1441 open revolt broke out most likely triggered by the high taxes. Due to peasants unrest on Zealand, the Rigsråd councillors complained to King Christopher III of Denmark. Legend has it that allegedly Vendel dwellers won the first battle of St Jørgensbjerg and burned down several of Hanherred's estates. In a following decisive Battle of Sankt Jørgensbjerg on 6 June 1441 the peasants were soundly defeated.

Henrik Tagesen Reventlow was captured and executed on 12 June 1441.

References 

Danish rebels
15th-century Danish people
Henrik
1441 deaths